Benny station is a Via Rail flag stop railway station located in Benny, Ontario, Canada on the Sudbury – White River train.

External links
Via Rail page for Benny train station

Via Rail stations in Ontario
Railway stations in Sudbury District
Canadian Pacific Railway stations in Ontario